The 2008 New Progressive Party primaries were the primary elections by which voters of the New Progressive Party (PNP) chose its nominees for various political offices of Puerto Rico, namely the position of governor, for the 2008 general elections. Resident Commissioner Luis Fortuño was selected as the nominee at the primary elections held on March 9, 2008. He would go on to win the 2008 general election as well.

Background

Pedro Rosselló had come from a defeat against Aníbal Acevedo Vilá at the 2004 elections. Despite that, he managed to gain a seat in the Senate. After an unsuccessful power struggle within the Senate to gain the presidency of the body, it was speculated that Rosselló would make another attempt at being elected Governor for the 2008 elections.

The power struggle had caused a division within the party, with the faction that supported Senate President Kenneth McClintock (called the "Auténticos") being expelled from the party during the previous year. Although the Supreme Court allowed them to run in the PNP primaries, Pedro Rosselló, then President of the party, still vouched for a "vote of punishment" against the senators, which he called "traitors".

Candidates

Governor

 Luis Fortuño, incumbent Resident Commissioner of Puerto Rico
 Pedro Rosselló, incumbent Senator and former Governor of Puerto Rico

Resident Commissioner

 Pedro Pierluisi, former Secretary of Justice
 Charlie Rodríguez, former President of the Senate of Puerto Rico
 Miriam Ramírez de Ferrer, former Senator

Senate

At-large

 Wanda Aponte
 Lucy Arce
 Luis Batista Salas
 Cristóbal Berríos
 Norma Burgos
 Luis Oscar Casillas
 Jorge de Castro Font
 Manuel de Jesús
 José Garriga Picó
 Roger Iglesias
 Tito Maldonado
 Roberto Carlos Mejill

 Henry Neumann
 Margarita Nolasco
 Reynaldo Paniagua
 Itzamar Peña
 Abid Quiñones
 Oreste Ramos
 Santos Ramos Lugo
 Thomas Rivera Schatz
 Orlando José Rivera Sepúlveda
 Luz M. "Tuty" Silva
 William Villafañe

District
The New Progressive Party held primaries on all 8 of the senatorial districts.

San Juan
 Roberto Arango
 Carlos Díaz
 Omar Miranda Torres
 Edward Moreno
 Kimmey Raschke

Bayamón
 Felix H. Delgado
 Héctor "Cano" O'Neill
 Pedro Orraca
 Migdalia Padilla
 Carmelo Ríos Santiago
 Edwin Rivera
 Noel Toro

Arecibo
 José Emilio González Velázquez
 Anthony López
 Johnny Maldonado
 Víctor "Buhito" Marrero
 Angel Martínez Santiago
 Roger Owens
 Gabriel Félix Rivera
 Alexis Valle

Mayagüez-Aguadilla
 Luis Daniel Muñiz Cortes
 Michael Nazario
 Carlos Pagán
 Jorge Rodríguez Feliciano
 Evelyn Vázquez

Ponce
 María Alvarado
 Luis A. Berdiel Rivera
 Juan Luis "Cuto" Colón
 Benny A. Morales
 Ramoncito Ramos
 Larry Seilhamer
 Luinel Torres Acosta

Guayama
 Osvaldo Colón Reyes
 Paco Fontánez
 Miguelito Martínez
 "Vi" Negrón
 Osvaldo Ortolaza Figueroa
 Luisito Pagán
 Robert Santiago
 Antonio Soto Díaz
 Carlos J. Torres Torres

Humacao
 Juan B.
 José R. Díaz Hernández
 Francisco "Paco" Pereira
 Luz M. Santiago González
 Rafi Uceta

Carolina
 Haydee Calderón Muñoz
 Héctor Martínez Maldonado
 Rosemary O'Connell
 Pablo Ramos
 Lornna Soto
 Nayda Venegas

House of Representatives

At-large

José Aponte
José Chico
Angel Cortés
Italo Costa Corsi
Rolando Crespo
Jenniffer González
Jaime Irizarry
Julio Lebrón Lamboy

Aixa Martinó
Nicolás Muñoz
Lourdes Ramos
Iris Miriam Ruíz
Soraya
José "Pichy" Torres Zamora
Félix Vega Fournier

District
The Popular Democratic Party held primaries on 30 of the 40 representative districts.

District 1
 Gloria Escudero
 Mario González La Fuente
 José "Nuno" López

District 4
 Liza Fernández
 Nelson A. Rivera

District 5
 Luisito Fuentes
 Jorge Navarro Suárez

District 6
 Javier Capestany Figueroa
 Angel Pérez Otero

District 8
 Toñito Silva
 Mario Tevenal

District 9
 Pito Marrero
 Angel "Gary" Rodríguez
 Rafy Rodríguez
 Juan "Papo" Soto

District 10
 Bernardo Márquez
 Pedro Julio Santiago
 Víctor Soto, Jr.

District 11
 Frank Acha
 Víctor "Pío" Concepción
 Miguel Angel Figueroa
 Jean P. Rubio
 María Vega Pagán

District 14
 Charlie Ayala
 Wilson Pantoja
 Gustavo Rodríguez
 Paula Rodríguez Homs
 Yamill

District 15
 Arnaldo Jiménez Valle
 Efraín Concepción
 Rey Escoriaza
 Nino Román

District 16
 Elisa Juarbe Beníquez
 Iván Rodríguez
 Miguel Trabal

District 17
 Rafael Lugo Hernández
 José L. Rivera Guerra
 Junior Robledo
 William

District 18
 David Bonilla Cortés
 Angel Muñoz

District 20
 Norman Ramírez Rivera
 Lucy Rivera

District 21
 Noel Morales, Jr.
 Rey

District 22
 Héctor Luis "Tito" Camacho
 Jorge Collazo
 Waldemar Quiles

District 23
 Luis Edgardo Díaz
 Julissa Nolasco
 Gaddier Oliveras
 Hernán Santiago

District 24
 John Giménez
 Luis "Tato" León

District 26
 Emilio
 José Luis Jiménez
 Freddy Santiago

District 28
 Carmen Gloria Hernández
 Rafael Rivera Ortega
 Jorge Santini

District 31
 Edgar Acevedo
 Junior Aponte
 Roberto López
 Jorge L. Reyes

District 32
 José R. Camino
 Shirley Ann Casillas
 Magal González

District 33
 Willy Gómez
 Angel R. Peña, Jr.
 Amparo Rodríguez
 Raúl Rodríguez

District 34
 Cristóbal Colón
 Pickie Díaz
 Lorenzo Valcárcel, Jr.

District 35
 Julio César
 Noé Marcano

District 36
 Johnny Méndez
 Augusto Sánchez

District 37
 Angel Bulerín
 William Cantres Nieves
 Normis Quintero

District 38
 Eric Correa
 Joel Cruz Hiraldo
 Wilfredo Pérez Torres
 Raymond Sánchez

District 39
 Sergio Esteves
 Esther
 César Valentín

District 40
 Elizabeth Casado
 Francisco, Jr.

Mayors
The New Progressive Party held primaries in 34 of 78 municipalities.

Aguada
 "Berty" Echevarría
 Manuel Santiago
 Lorenzo Vale, Jr.

Aguas Buenas
 Miguel
 Edwin Morales
 Vitín Ramos

Arecibo
 Carlos Molina
 Angel "Kuko" Ramos
 Lemuel Soto

Arroyo
 Darwin Covas
 Basilio Figueroa
 Ramón Morales

Caguas
 Orlando Rivera
 Carlos González

Camuy
 Edwin García Feliciano
 Johnny

Canóvanas
 Roberto Cruz
 Manuel Quiñones
 José "Chemo" Soto

Cataño

 Julio Alicea
 Mayra Ramsamy
 Wilson Soto
 Yareco

Cayey
 Wilson Colón
 Benjamín González

Ceiba
 Pedro Colón Osorio
 Angelo Cruz Ramos

Corozal
 Roberto Hernández Vélez
 Norberto Torres

Florida
 Aaron Pargas Ojeda
 Víctor M. Rodríguez

Guaynabo
 Héctor O'Neill
 Miguel Gutarra

Humacao
 "Piloto" Santiago
 Maritza Vargas

Juana Díaz
 Gardy Guzmán
 Nilsa Santiago

Juncos
 Junito Mulero
 Karen Velázquez

Lajas
 Leo Cotte
 Edgardo
 Johnny Ramos

Lares
 Roberto Pagán Centeno
 Eddie Nuñez

Las Piedras
 Micky López
 Angel R. Peña

Loíza
 Luis Ambrosio de Jesús
 Eddie Manso

Luquillo
 José "Nelo" González
 Rafa Pérez

Morovis
 Norberto Negrón
 Heriberto Rodríguez

Patillas
 Benjamín Cintrón Lebrón
 Maritza Rivera

Ponce
 Angel Llavona
 María "Mayita" Meléndez

Quebradillas
 Moisés Soto
 Elías Nieves

Rincón
 María Lourdes Méndez
 Eddie Ríos

Río Grande
 César
 María Milagros Charbonier
 Javier Sánchez

Sabana Grande
 Wilfrido Bonilla
 Santitos Rivera
 Linnette Toledo

Salinas
 Ernesto Aponte
 Jorgito Díaz
 Carlos Rodríguez Mateo

San Germán
 Mónica Alpi
 Luis Cancel
 Efraín Montalvo
 Edgardo Suárez

San Sebastián
 Javier Jiménez
 Justo Medina

Toa Alta
 Luis Collazo Rivera
 Nelson
 Evelyn Ortega

Trujillo Alto
 Julio Andino
 Emmanuel Huertas
 Eduardo Otero

Utuado
 Alan González Cancel
 Jorgito Pérez

Results

The primaries were held on March 9, 2008. In it, Fortuño comfortably defeated Rosselló to win the spot for Governor at the 2008 elections. Also, Pedro Pierluisi defeated Charlie Rodríguez and Miriam Ramírez de Ferrer with 60% of the votes to win the spot for Resident Commissioner.

Governor

Resident Commissioner

Senate

At-large

District

San Juan

Bayamón

Arecibo

Mayagüez-Aguadilla

Ponce

Guayama

Humacao

Carolina

House of Representatives

At-large

District

District 1

District 4

District 5

District 6

District 8

District 10

District 11

District 14

District 15

District 16

District 17

District 18

District 20

District 21

District 23

District 24

District 26

District 28

District 31

District 32

District 33

District 34

District 35

District 36

District 37

District 38

District 39

District 40

Aftermath

Members of PPD voting

During and after the primaries, members of the New Progressive Party (PNP), like Senator Norma Burgos, claimed they saw voters affiliated with the opposing Popular Democratic Party (PPD) voting in the PNP ballots. Also, Maritza Vázquez, Electoral Commissioner of PPD representative Conny Varela, admitted in 2010 that "thousands of 'populares' voted on that election'". Some of the supporters of Rosselló maintain that this "crossover" was crucial in Pedro Rosselló's defeat against Luis Fortuño.

Rosselló "Write-In" campaign

As a result of Rosselló's loss in the primaries, a group of his supporters started a campaign to have him elected through "Write-in" voting.

The fate of the "Auténticos"

Despite Rosselló's call for a "vote of punishment" against the "Auténticos", all but one of the eligible candidates from that faction were elected in the primaries. Carlos Díaz was edged out of the election race by Senators Roberto Arango and Kimmey Raschke. Migdalia Padilla, Lucy Arce, and Jorge de Castro Font were all elected. Kenneth McClintock had decided not to run for Senate, while Orlando Parga refused to return to the party after his expulsion, and started an independent campaign.

See also

Popular Democratic Party primaries, 2008

References

Primary elections in Puerto Rico
2008 Puerto Rico elections
New Progressive Party (Puerto Rico)